Merkur (Mercury) is a defunct automobile brand that was marketed by the Lincoln-Mercury division of Ford Motor Company from 1985 to 1989. Drawing its name from the German word for Mercury, Merkur was targeted at buyers of European executive cars in North America, selling captive imports produced by the German division of Ford of Europe.

Following the 1989 model year, Lincoln-Mercury withdrew Merkur, making it one of the shortest-lived automotive brands in the modern American automotive industry, lasting only one model year longer than Ford's earlier, more prominent failure, the Edsel.

Background 
During the late 1970s and early 1980s in the United States and Canada, buyer preferences in the luxury-vehicle segment began shifting from once traditional Cadillac, Lincoln and Chrysler models towards more European-produced and inspired vehicles.  As a response, the Japanese automotive industry launched luxury-oriented brands developed for North America, with Honda's Acura brand going on sale in 1985 and Nissan and Toyota bringing Infiniti and Lexus, respectively, to market in 1989.

In its own response, Ford announced the creation of the Merkur brand in November 1983 with an expected launch for the 1985 model year.  Instead of developing all-new product lines, Merkur adapted vehicles from Ford of Europe to meet American safety and emissions regulations. During the 1970s, the Mercury Capri had been imported from West Germany, becoming the most-imported car in the United States behind the Volkswagen Beetle.

In the initial launch of Merkur, approximately 800 Lincoln-Mercury dealers signed up to take on the Merkur brand.  Advertising and PR materials strongly urged the proper German pronunciation of the brand name (German for Mercury). On Merkur vehicle badges was a script stating: Ford Werke AG-Cologne, West Germany, indicating the car's place of manufacture (Cologne Body & Assembly).

Models
The Merkur model line consisted of two models: the three-door XR4Ti hatchback and the five-door Scorpio hatchback. North American regulations dictated a number of modifications to the design of the vehicles, which meant that a Merkur could not be identical to a European-market Ford Sierra or Ford Scorpio. To adapt a Merkur for sale in the United States and Canada, 5-mph bumpers were added, FMVSS 108-compliant headlamps, and an instrument panel with non-metric gauges.

XR4Ti

Introduced for 1985 as the introductory Merkur vehicle, the Merkur XR4Ti was a performance-oriented hatchback. Sized nearly identically to the Ford Mustang hatchback, the XR4Ti was a slightly rebodied version of the Ford Sierra XR4i, the mid-range sporting model of the Sierra. The XR4Ti name was chosen by Merkur as General Motors used the GMC Sierra and the Oldsmobile Cutlass Ciera nameplates.

To comply with American emissions regulations, the 148 hp 2.8L V6 of the XR4i was replaced by a 2.3L turbocharged inline-4. Shared with the Ford Thunderbird Turbo Coupe, Mercury Cougar XR7, and Ford Mustang SVO, the engine made 175 hp with a 5-speed manual transmission and 145 hp with a 3-speed automatic transmission.

The body of the XR4Ti (modified for American regulations) was shared with the Sierra XR4i, it differed from the standard Sierra 3-door in its side profile appearance, in place of the long rear quarter windows of a standard Sierra 3-door, the Merkur is fitted with the C-pillar windows of the 5-door Sierra, with opening rear quarter windows behind the front doors. In line with the XR4i, the Merkur XR4Ti is distinguished by a large biplane rear spoiler (similar to the Ford Mustang SVO).

As a result of the Merkur XR4Ti requiring adaptation for North American sale, final assembly was contracted to specialty manufacturer Karmann in Rheine, West Germany. Prior to the 1988 introduction of the Merkur Scorpio, the XR4Ti was the sole Merkur model. In early 1989, the XR4Ti was discontinued.

Scorpio

Introduced in mid-1987 as a 1988 model, the Merkur Scorpio was targeted for the executive sedan segment.  Slightly smaller than the Ford Taurus (though longer in wheelbase), the Merkur Scorpio was adapted directly from the Ford Scorpio, the largest car sold by Ford of Europe. Competing against the Acura Legend, Audi 100, Mercedes-Benz 190E, Saab 9000, Sterling 827, and Volvo 740, in sharp contrast to most of its luxury competitors, the Scorpio was a 5-door hatchback (a bodystyle otherwise only seen in the Saabs and Sterlings in North America). Merkur Scorpios included many standard features and most were sold with the optional Touring Package upgrade.

In contrast to the XR4Ti, the Merkur Scorpio was built directly on the Ford Cologne assembly line in West Germany, as its body was largely unchanged (with the exception of 5-mph bumpers and US-market lighting).  Powertrain modifications were minimal, as the 2.9L V6 was an engine used in North America (by the Ranger and Bronco II). While a 5-speed manual transmission was standard, nearly every Scorpio sold was equipped with a 4-speed automatic transmission.

One of the shortest-lived vehicles ever produced by Ford Motor Company, the Merkur Scorpio was discontinued at the end of the 1989 model year, marking the end of the Merkur brand.

Discontinuation
In the United States and Canada, Merkur was ultimately not considered a success by Ford. Initially projecting 15,000-20,000 yearly sales for Merkur, only 26,000 XR4Tis were sold in 1985 and 1986 combined, with sales dropping nearly 50% for 1987. On average, each Lincoln-Mercury dealer sold one to two Merkur vehicles. Several factors led to the slow sales of the Merkur line, including an unfavorable exchange rate between the dollar and the West German Deutsche mark, leading to unstable pricing. By 1989, the Merkur Scorpio rivaled the Lincoln Town Car in price, despite its strong visual resemblance to the far more affordable Mercury Sable.

At the end of 1989, the decision to drop the Merkur line was driven by future passive restraint requirements in North America. To bring the XR4Ti and Scorpio into compliance, the model lines would have needed airbag(s) or a passive restraint system (automatic seatbelts) to do so. As the slow sales of the model line no longer justified the expense of such a redesign (their European counterparts would not receive airbags until they were replaced in 1994), Ford chose to end the Merkur line, withdrawing the XR4Ti in early 1989 with the Scorpio following at the end of the 1989 model year.

References

External links 

 Merkur Club of America

 
Ford Motor Company
Ford of Europe
Ford Motor Company of Canada
1980s cars
American brands
Defunct brands
Defunct motor vehicle manufacturers of the United States
Vehicle manufacturing companies established in 1983
Vehicle manufacturing companies disestablished in 1989
1983 establishments in the United States
1989 disestablishments in the United States
Ford Motor Company Marques
Luxury motor vehicle manufacturers